Kalju-Hillar Suur (18 February 1928 Tallinn – 13 November 2013) was an Estonian photographer.

1981-1994 he was photoreporter of the newspaper Sirp ja Vasar.

He established Tallinn Photo Club and the photographical collective Stodom. In 1995 he established the publishing house Suurkalju.

He participated over 150 international photo exhibitions.

Awards:
 2001: Order of the White Star, V class.

References

1928 births
2013 deaths
Estonian photographers
Recipients of the Order of the White Star, 5th Class
People from Tallinn
Burials at Metsakalmistu